Sinqua Walls (born April 6, 1985) is an American actor known for appearing in Friday Night Lights, The Secret Life of the American Teenager, and American Soul.

Early life and education 
Originally from Louisiana, Sinqua moved to Marina del Rey, California, with his family and attended El Segundo High School. Walls became interested in acting as a child after watching Radio Flyer. In 2007, he graduated from University of San Francisco, where he studied theatre and film. During college, Walls played on the San Francisco Dons men's basketball team.

Career 
Walls played Boyd, a beta werewolf who was a formerly recurring character on the MTV drama series Teen Wolf. He has also made appearances on Pair of Kings, Lincoln Heights, Friday Night Lights, Grey's Anatomy, Blue Mountain State, The Secret Life of the American Teenager, Necessary Roughness, and on MTV's Next.

He starred in the 2011 horror feature Shark Night 3D. Walls played a guest role on the second season of the ABC fantasy series Once Upon a Time, as Sir Lancelot. He returned to the show during the fifth season as a guest star. He played the role of Shawn in the TV series Power. On August 1, 2017, Walls was cast in Clint Eastwood's biopic The 15:17 to Paris, about the thwarted 2015 Thalys train attack. The film premiered on February 9, 2018.

Since 2019, Walls has portrayed Don Cornelius in BET's American Soul, a fictionalized drama series based on Cornelius's long-running television dance show Soul Train.

Filmography

Film

Television

References

External links

1985 births
Living people
American male television actors
African-American actors
University of San Francisco alumni
El Segundo High School alumni
21st-century African-American people
20th-century African-American people